Naval Agent, or Navy Agent, may refer to:
 a member of a:
 naval intelligence service;
 naval police service, or;
 an archaic/obsolete term for a person who specializes in naval logistics and is usually either a
 naval supply officer, or;
 civilian contractor.